Phytoecia praetextata is a species of beetle in the family Cerambycidae. It was described by Steven in 1817, originally under the genus Saperda. It is known from Turkey, Bulgaria, Syria, Armenia, Romania, and Ukraine.

Subspecies
 Phytoecia praetextata praetextata Steven, 1817
 Phytoecia praetextata nigricollis Pic, 1892

References

Phytoecia
Beetles described in 1817